Schalmei may refer to:

 Shawm, a double reeded woodwind instrument from the Renaissance period.
 Martinshorn, a free reed instrument invented by Max Martin in 1880.